Barbara Aigner (born 29 April 2005) is an Austrian visually impaired para alpine skier who competed at the 2022 Winter Paralympics.

Career
Aigner made her debut at the 2021 World Para Snow Sports Championships where she won the gold medal in the giant slalom event.

Aigner competed at the 2022 Winter Paralympics and won a silver medal in the slalom and a bronze medal in the giant slalom.

Personal life
Aigner's twin brother, Johannes, and older sister Veronika are both visually impaired para skiers.

References 

2005 births
Living people
Austrian female alpine skiers
Alpine skiers at the 2022 Winter Paralympics
Medalists at the 2022 Winter Paralympics
Paralympic silver medalists for Austria
Paralympic bronze medalists for Austria
Paralympic medalists in alpine skiing
Visually impaired category Paralympic competitors
Austrian blind people
Austrian twins
21st-century Austrian women